Edward Grant (1926–2020) was an American historian of medieval science.

Edward Grant, Eddie Grant, Ted Grant, or similar names may also refer to:
 Edward Grant (headmaster) (1540s–1601), English classical scholar, poet and headmaster
 Edward Grant (cricketer) (1874–1953), English cricketer
 Eddie Grant (baseball) (1883–1918), former third baseman in the Major Leagues who was killed searching for the "Lost Battalion" in World War I
 Ted Grant (1913–2006), South African politician
 Eddie Grant (footballer) (1928–1979), Scottish footballer
 Eddy Grant (born 1948), Guyanese-born musician and record producer

Other uses
 Wildcat (Ted Grant), a DC Comics superhero